The Cooper, later Paston-Cooper, later Astley-Cooper Baronetcy, of Gadebridge in the County of Hertford, is a title in the Baronetage of the United Kingdom. It was created on 31 August 1821 for the noted surgeon and anatomist Astley Cooper, with remainder, in default of male issue, to his nephew Astley Paston Cooper, third son of his elder brother Reverend Samuel Lovick Cooper, who succeeded as second Baronet in 1841. The third and fourth Baronets used the surname of Paston-Cooper. The sixth Baronet used the surname of Astley-Cooper, which is also used by the seventh Baronet and (as of 2007) present holder of the title.

Astley-Cooper baronets, of Gadebridge (1821)
Sir Astley Paston Cooper, 1st Baronet (1768–1841)
Sir Astley Paston Cooper, 2nd Baronet (1798–1866)
Sir Astley Paston Paston-Cooper, 3rd Baronet (1824–1904)
Sir Charles Naunton Paston Paston-Cooper, 4th Baronet (1867–1941)
Sir Henry Lovick Cooper, 5th Baronet (1875–1959)
Sir Patrick Graham Astley-Cooper, 6th Baronet (1918–2002)
Sir Alexander Paston Astley-Cooper, 7th Baronet (born 1943)

See also
Astley baronets
Cooper baronets

References

Kidd, Charles, Williamson, David (editors). Debrett's Peerage and Baronetage (1990 edition). New York: St Martin's Press, 1990.

Baronetcies in the Baronetage of the United Kingdom
Baronetcies created with special remainders